The Morocco national beach soccer team represents Morocco in international beach soccer competitions and is controlled by the Royal Moroccan Football Federation, the governing body for football in Morocco.

Achievements

CAF Beach Soccer Championship
 2006 CAF Beach Soccer Championship – Sixth Place
 2007 CAF Beach Soccer Championship – Did not enter
 2008 CAF Beach Soccer Championship – Did not enter
 2009 CAF Beach Soccer Championship – Round 1
 2011 CAF Beach Soccer Championship – Round 1
 2013 CAF Beach Soccer Championship –  Third Place
 2015 CAF Beach Soccer Championship – Fifth Place
 2016 Africa Beach Soccer Cup of Nations – Fourth Place
 2018 Africa Beach Soccer Cup of Nations  - Fourth Place
 2021 Africa Beach Soccer Cup of Nations –  Third Place
 2022 Africa Beach Soccer Cup of Nations –  Third Place

2021 Africa Beach Soccer Cup of Nations

Group B

Semi finals
Winners qualify for the 2021 FIFA Beach Soccer World Cup.

Third place play-off

Current squad
Correct as of May 2021.

Coach: Mustafa El Haddaoui

Honours

Official competitions 
Africa Beach Soccer Cup of Nations
  Third-place: 2013, 2021 ,2022
Arab Beach Soccer Championship
  Runners-up: 2016

Friendly Tournament
Casablanca Beach Soccer Tournament
 Champions: 2009
 Runners-up: 2022
 Third-place: 2010

References

External links
 Squad

African national beach soccer teams
Beach Soccer